Charles McDuffie Wilder (1835 - 1902) was a public official in South Carolina who was appointed postmaster by U.S. President Ulysses S. Grant and was a city councilor in Columbia, South Carolina. He established himself as a carpenter. He served as a member of the South Carolina General Assembly.

He was born circa 1835 in Sumter, South Carolina.

He represented Richland County in the General Assembly. He also served as postmaster and was a Columbia City Council member. He held the postmaster position for 16 years.

He is buried at the Randolph Cemetery.

References

1835 births
1902 deaths